Statebank, Mangalore is a locality in Mangalore which is also the heart of Mangalore. In simple words State Bank is what Majestic area is to Bangalore. Mangalore's city bus station is also situated in State Bank. Almost all the city buses in Mangalore have State Bank as the destination location, which is why it is common for one to see "State Bank"  written in bus route display of most of the private and KSRTC buses.

This place would have inherited this name as the main branch of State Bank of India of Mangalore region is located at Old Port Road.

References 

Localities in Mangalore